Tokuko is a feminine Japanese given name. Notable people with the name include:

, Japanese handball player
, Japanese dancer and actress
, Japanese empress
, Japanese photographer

Japanese feminine given names